Ifeoma Yvonne Ajunwa (born 26 October 1980) is a Nigerian-American legal scholar, writer and tenured professor of law at the University of North Carolina School Of Law in the United States. She is also the Founding Director of the AI Decision-Making Research (AI-DR) Program at UNC Law. From 2021-2022, she is a Fulbright Scholar to Nigeria where she is studying the role of law for tech start-ups.  Starting in January 2022, she was named a visiting fellow to Yale Law School's Information Society Project (ISP). She was previously an assistant professor of labor and employment law at Cornell University from 2017-2020, earning tenure there in 2020. She has been a Faculty Associate at the Berkman Klein Center at Harvard Law School since 2017.

Education 
Ajunwa received her BA at University of California, Davis in 2003, her JD at University of San Francisco School of Law in 2007, and her MPhil and PhD in Sociology at Columbia University in 2012 and 2017, respectively. Ajunwa was a McNair Scholar as an undergraduate student, received an AAUW Selected Professions Fellowship in law school, and was a Paul F. Lazersfeld Fellow as a PhD student.
Ajunwa's PhD thesis was advised by Josh Whitford.

Career 
Ajunwa is a prolific writer, legal scholar, AI ethics researcher, and tenured professor of law at the University of North Carolina School Of Law where she serves as the Founding Director of the AI Decision-Making Research (AI-DR) Program. Prior to that, Ajunwa was a professor at the Cornell University School of Industrial and Labor Relations and an associate faculty member at Cornell Law School.
She is a Faculty Associate at the Berkman Klein Center for Internet & Society at Harvard University, where previously she was a Fellow from 2016-2017 and a Teaching Fellow at Harvard Law School,. She also served as a Microsoft Research NYC Research Intern in 2015.

Ajunwa's research interests are at the intersection of law and technology with a particular focus on  the ethical governance of workplace technologies, race and tech, corporate governance, and health equity and privacy. Her research focus is also on diversity and inclusion in the labor market and the workplace.
She will publish a book - "The Quantified Worker" - with Cambridge University Press.

Ajunwa was awarded tenure by Cornell University on May 22, 2020. On February 5, 2020, Ajunwa testified at a U.S. House of Representatives Committee on Education and Labor hearing on "The Future of Work: Protecting Workers' Civil Rights in the Digital Age". She discussed artificial intelligence-enabled racial bias in hiring practices and advocated for legislation protecting personal and genetic data privacy in the workplace. On May 6, 2018, Ajunwa was a TEDx Speaker at Cornell University where she presented a talk on the Controversies of Ethics and Technology in the Modern Workplace. At Cornell, Ajunwa has served as a board member on several advisory boards, including for the Institute for Africa Development and the Cornell Prison Education Program (CPEP). Recently, Ajunwa was awarded a Fulbright to study legal issues related to tech start-ups in Nigeria.

Awards and honors 
2016-2017: Fellow, Berkman Klein Center at Harvard University
2018: Derrick A. Bell Award from the Association of American Law Schools
2018-2019: Keeton House Fellow, Cornell University
2019: NSF CAREER Award
2020: Faculty Champion Award, Cornell University 
2021-2022: Fulbright Scholar (host country: Nigeria)
2022 - : Visiting Fellow, Yale Law School's Information Society Project

Selected works 
Ajunwa's scholarly writing includes:

For Law review:

 An Auditing Imperative for Automated Hiring Systems, 34 Harv. J.L. & Tech. 1 (2021).
 The Paradox of Automation as Anti-Bias Intervention, 41 Cardozo. L. Rev.1671(2020).
 Age Discrimination by Platforms, 40 Berkeley J. Emp. & Lab. L.1 (2019).
 Algorithms at Work: Productivity Monitoring Applications and Wearable Technology, 63 St. Louis U. L.J. 21 (2019).Ife
 Combatting Discrimination Against the Formerly Incarcerated in the Labor Market, 112 Nw. U. L. Rev. 1385 (2018). (with Professor Angela Onwuachi-Willig).
 Limitless Worker Surveillance, 105 Cal. L. Rev. 736 ( 2017) (with Professors Jason Schultz and Kate Crawford).
 Genetic Data and Civil Rights, 51 Harv. C.R.-C.L. L. Rev. 75 (2016).
 The Modern Day Scarlet Letter, 83 Fordham L. Rev. 2999 (2015).
 Genetic Testing Meets Big Data: Tort and Contract Law Issues, 75 Ohio St. L. J. 1225 (2014).
 Bad Barrels: An Organizational-Based Analysis of Human Rights Abuses Within the American Carceral System, 17 U. PA. J. L. & Soc. Change 75 (2014).

For Peer Review and Other Publications:

 “Race, Labor, and the Future of Work,” Oxford Handbook of Race and Law in the United States, Eds. Devon Carbado, Emily Houh, and Khiara Bridges (invited Contribution) (forthcoming 2020)
 “The Black Box at Work” Special Issue of Big Data and Society, Eds. Frank Pasquale and Benedetta Brevini (invited Contribution) (forthcoming 2020)
 Evolving public views on the value of one’s DNA and expectations for genomic database governance: Results from a national survey  Briscoe F, Ajunwa I, Gaddis A, McCormick J (2020) PLOS ONE 15(3): e0229044. https://doi.org/10.1371/journal.pone.0229044
 “Platforms at Work: Automated Hiring Platforms and Other New Intermediaries in the Organization of the Workplace.” (with Daniel Greene) In Work and Labor in the Digital Age. Research in the Sociology of Work. Published online: 14 Jun 2019; 61-91.
 Ajunwa, I. & Caplan, R. (2018). DNA Technology. SAGE Encyclopedia of Surveillance, Security and Privacy. (invited contribution).
 “Health and Big Data: An Ethical Framework for Health Information Collection By Corporate Wellness Programs”, Journal of Law, Medicine, and Ethics, 44 (2016): 474-480 (with Kate Crawford and Joel Ford).

Ajunwa's public media writing includes:
Ifeoma Ajunwa, "The Power of Ketanji Brown Jackson's African Name," Slate, March 24, 2022 
Ifeoma Ajunwa, "Can We Trust Corporate Commitments to Racial Equity?", Forbes, February 23, 2021
Ifeoma Ajunwa, Forrest Briscoe, "The Answer to a COVID-19 Vaccine May Lie in Our Genes, But ...", Scientific American, May 13, 2020
Ifeoma Ajunwa, "Beware of Automated Hiring", The New York Times, October 8, 2019
Ifeoma Ajunwa, "The Rise of Platform Authoritarianism", ACLU, April 10, 2018
Ifeoma Ajunwa, "Facebook users aren’t the reason Facebook is in trouble now", Washington Post, March 23, 2018
Ifeoma Ajunwa, "Corporate Surveillance Is Turning Human Workers Into Fungible Cogs", The Atlantic, May 19, 2017
Ifeoma Ajunwa, "Workplace Wellness Programs Could Be Putting Your Health Data at Risk", Harvard Business Review, January 19, 2017
Ifeoma Ajunwa, "A call to 'ban the box' on college applications", Washington Examiner, November 10, 2015
Ifeoma Ajunwa, "The other big US Supreme Court decision we should be celebrating is one no one’s talking about", Quartz, June 29, 2015
Ifeoma Ajunwa, "There’s No Guarantee of Anonymity", The New York Times, March 4, 2015
Ifeoma Ajunwa, "Do You Know Where Your Health Data Is?", Huffington Post, February 13, 2015
Ifeoma Ajunwa, "For Ebola Response - Think Infrastructure, Not Donations", Huffington Post, November 30, 2014
Ifeoma Ajunwa, "West Africa Does Not Need Your Donations to Fight Ebola", Huffington Post, November 13, 2014

References

External links 
 
 
 

Cornell University faculty
University of California, Davis alumni
University of San Francisco School of Law alumni
Columbia Graduate School of Arts and Sciences alumni
21st-century American non-fiction writers
21st-century American women writers
1980 births
Nigerian academics
Living people
Nigerian women writers
Nigerian non-fiction writers
Nigerian emigrants to the United States
American women academics